Ridgedale is a village in the Canadian province of Saskatchewan within the Rural Municipality of Connaught No. 457 and Census Division No. 14.

History 
Ridgedale incorporated as a village on December 15, 1921.

Demographics 

References

Everything Changes But The Memories 

Villages in Saskatchewan
Connaught No. 457, Saskatchewan
Division No. 14, Saskatchewan